Zostera mucronata  is a species of eelgrass native to the seacoasts of  South Australia and Western Australia.

References

mucronata
Angiosperms of Western Australia
Flora of South Australia
Plants described in 1970
Salt marsh plants